Myrceugenia schulzei is a species of plant in the family Myrtaceae. It is endemic to Alejandro Selkirk Island, of the Juan Fernández Islands archipelago in the Pacific Ocean, territory of the Republic of Chile.  It is threatened by habitat loss.

References

Alejandro Selkirk Island
schulzei
Endemic flora of the Juan Fernández Islands
Vulnerable plants
Taxonomy articles created by Polbot